The Simple Truth is a crime novel written by David Baldacci. The book was initially published on November 18, 1998 by Grand Central Publishing.

References

External links

1998 American novels
Novels by David Baldacci